General Douglas may refer to:

Archibald Douglas (1707–1778), British Army lieutenant general
Archibald Douglas (1883–1960), Swedish Army lieutenant general
Charles W. H. Douglas (1850–1914), British Army general
George Douglas, 1st Earl of Dumbarton (1635–1692), English Army major general
Gustaf Otto Douglas (1687–1771), Swedish mercenary general for the Russian Army
Henry Edward Manning Douglas (1875–1939), British Army major general
Henry Kyd Douglas (1838–1903), Maryland National Guard major general
Howard Douglas (1776–1861), British Army general
James Douglas (British Army officer) (1785–1862), British Army general
James Douglas (English Army officer) (1645–1691), Scottish lieutenant general
James Douglas, Lord of Douglas (c. 1286–1330), general in the Wars of Scottish Independence
John Douglas (British Army officer) (1817–1888), British Army general
John Douglas (Royal Marines officer) (died 1814), Royal Marines major general
Kenneth Douglas (1754–1833), British Army lieutenant general
Neil Douglas (1779–1853), British Army lieutenant general
Paul P. Douglas Jr. (1919–2002), U.S. Air Force brigadier general
Robert Douglas (1727–1809) (1727–1809), Scottish-born mercenary Dutch Republic major general 
Robert Percy Douglas (1805–1891), British Army general
Thomas Monteath Douglas (1787–1868), Bengal Army general
William Douglas (British Army officer, died 1920) (1858–1920), British Army major general

See also
John Douglas-Withers (1919–1997), British Army major general
Attorney General Douglas (disambiguation)